Decisions is the third widely available studio album by American blues rock musician and computer scientist Jim Allchin. It was released on June 16, 2017 by Sandy Key Music. The title of the album is a reference to the decisions we make in our life about identity, relationships, and how to live life authentically.

Reception
Decisions received positive comments and ratings by reviewers.

Track listing

Personnel

Musicians
Jim Allchin – guitar, vocals, arrangements
Tom Hambridge – drums, percussion
Michael Rhodes – bass
Reese Wynans – keyboard
Rob McNelley – guitar
Steve Mackey – bass on "After Hours," "Destiny"
Kenny Greenberg – guitar on "After Hours," "Destiny"
James Wallace – keyboard on "After Hours," "Destiny"
Pat Buchannan – guitar

Guest musicians
Keb' Mo' – vocals on "Healing Ground"
Mycle Wastman – background vocals on "She is It," "You Might Be Wrong," "Healing Ground"
Wendy Moten – background vocals on "Healing Ground"
The Heart Attack Horns - horns

Production
Tom Hambridge – produced
Ernesto Olvera-Lapier – tracking and mixing engineer engineering, mixing
Sean Badum (Studio D) – assistant engineer 
Jason Mott (Studio E) – assistant engineer
Tommy MacDonald – project assistant
John Heithaus – project executive
The Switchyard - mastering

References

2017 albums
Jim Allchin albums